Tetraopes termophilus is a species of beetle in the family Cerambycidae. It was described by Chevrolat in 1861. It is known from Nicaragua and the United States.

References

Tetraopini
Beetles described in 1861